Burzet is a commune in the Ardèche department in southern France.

Notable people
 

Victor Plantevin (1900–1983), politician

See also
Communes of the Ardèche department

References

External links

Communes of Ardèche
Monte Carlo Rally
Ardèche communes articles needing translation from French Wikipedia